Cyberdreams is a defunct American video game developer.

Cyberdreams may also refer to:

 Cyberdreams, a 1995 French anthology by G. David Nordley
 Cyberdreams, a 2002 album by Westworld
 Isaac Asimov's Cyberdreams, a 1994 anthology edited by Gardner Dozois and Sheila Williams